Jani Christou (Giánnīs Chrī́stou; 8 or 9 January 1926 – 8 January 1970) was a Greek composer.

Biography
There is some disagreement about Christou's birth, the date of which is given by some authorities as 8 January; while others state 9 January. Most sources agree that he was born in Heliopolis, Egypt, though one states he was born in Alexandria, and it has recently been reported that a birth certificate has been found stating that the composer was born in Nicosia, Cyprus, though this certificate is suspected of being a forgery.  His parents were Eleutherios Christou, a Greek industrialist and chocolate manufacturer, and Lilika Tavernari, of Cypriot origin.  He was educated at the English School in Alexandria and he took his first piano lessons from various teachers and from the important Greek pianist Gina Bachauer. In 1948 he gained an MA in philosophy after having studied with Ludwig Wittgenstein and Bertrand Russell in King's College, Cambridge.

During that time he also studied music with Hans Redlich (then living at Letchworth) and in 1949 travelled to Rome to study orchestration with Angelo Francesco Lavagnino. He briefly attended lectures by Carl Jung in Zurich. In 1951 he returned to Alexandria where he married Theresia Horemi in 1961. He died on or the day before his 44th birthday in a car accident in Athens, Greece.

Main works 
 Phoenix Music (for orchestra) – 1949
 Symphony No. 1 – 1949–50
 Latin Liturgy – 1953
 Six T. S. Eliot Songs (for piano or orchestra and mezzo-soprano) – 1955 (piano) / 1957 (orch.)
 Symphony No. 2 – 1957–58
 Toccata for piano and orchestra – 1962
 Tongues of Fire (a Pentecost oratorio) – 1964
 Persians (Incidental music for Aeschylus' drama) – 1965
 Agamemnon – 1965
 Enantiodromia – 1965–68
 The Frogs – 1966
 Mysterion (for orchestra, tape, choir and soloists) – 1965–66
 Praxis for 12 (for 11 string instruments and director-pianist) – 1966
 Anaparastasis I (The Baritone) – 1968
 Anaparastasis III (The Pianist) – 1968
 Oedipus Rex – 1969
 Oresteia (unfinished) – 1967–70

Notes

References

External links
Jani Christou Website (archive from 11 September 2017, accessed 7 December 2018)
A Jani Christou knol

1926 births
1970 deaths
Greek classical composers
Greek classical musicians
Road incident deaths in Greece
20th-century classical musicians
20th-century composers
People from Cairo Governorate